Drasteria tejonica is a moth of the family Erebidae. It has been recorded from California, Arizona, Colorado, Utah and New Mexico.

The wingspan is 30–36 mm.

References

External links

Drasteria
Moths described in 1870
Moths of North America